David Edward C. Hutton (born 4 December 1989) is an English born Irish footballer who plays for Hayes & Yeading United. He has also been capped by the Republic of Ireland at Under-15 and 16 level.

Career

Hutton attended Enfield Grammar School where he helped the school football team win the Middlesex Cup. He joined the Tottenham youth academy in 2006–07.

In March 2009, Hutton went on loan to Cheltenham Town and made his league debut against Leyton Orient on 4 April 2009. Hutton's first league and Cheltenham goal came on 10 April 2009 in a 1–1 draw away at Peterborough United.

On 11 May 2009, Hutton joined Cheltenham Town permanently on a one-year deal. He was released by the club along with seven other players in May 2010.

On 15 July 2010, Hutton joined Grimsby Town on trial and played in several pre-season friendlies against Boston United, then Stirling Albion but failed to impress enough to earn a contract.

After a brief spell with St Albans City he signed with Spanish side Jerez Industrial.

Hutton has also had spells at Boreham Wood, Hemel Hempstead Town and signed for Dunstable Town in the summer of 2014.

On 9 December 2014, Hutton signed for fellow Southern Premier Division side St Neots Town.

After a short spell with St Neots, Hutton joined league rivals Biggleswade Town in late January 2015.

Hutton later moved on to Bishops Stortford in 2015, before signing for Southern Football League side Kings Langley early into the 2015–2016 season.

References

External links
 tottenhamhotspur.com Profile
 
 
 Profile at Aylesbury United

1989 births
Living people
Footballers from Enfield, London
Republic of Ireland association footballers
Tottenham Hotspur F.C. players
Cheltenham Town F.C. players
Jerez Industrial CF players
Kingstonian F.C. players
St Albans City F.C. players
Boreham Wood F.C. players
Hemel Hempstead Town F.C. players
Dunstable Town F.C. players
St Neots Town F.C. players
Biggleswade Town F.C. players
Bishop's Stortford F.C. players
Kings Langley F.C. players
Chesham United F.C. players
Hayes & Yeading United F.C. players
English Football League players
Southern Football League players
Isthmian League players
Tercera División players
People educated at Enfield Grammar School
Expatriate footballers in Spain
Association football midfielders